Stair is a village in Cumbria, England. It is situated in the Newlands Valley, to the west of Derwent Water and within the Lake District National Park.

For administrative purposes, Stair lies within the civil parish of Above Derwent, the district of Allerdale, and the county of Cumbria. It is within the Workington constituency of the United Kingdom Parliament. Prior to Brexit in 2020, it was in the North West England constituency of the European Parliament.

Gallery

References

External links

Villages in Cumbria
Allerdale